is a Shingon temple in Matsuyama, Japan. It is Temple 49 on the Shikoku 88 temple pilgrimage, and temple two on The Thirteen Buddhist Sites of Iyo.

History
Said to have been founded by Gyōki, Kūya lodged at the temple for three years. Burned during fighting in 1416, it was rebuilt by the Kōno clan. Sixteenth-century graffiti indicates that by that time Tendai priests and members of the peasantry had joined the ranks of pilgrims.

Buildings
 Hondō (1482), an Important Cultural Property.

Treasures
  (Kamakura period) (ICP)

See also

 Shikoku 88 temple pilgrimage

References

Buddhist temples in Ehime Prefecture
Shingon Buddhism
Buddhist pilgrimage sites in Japan